Peroulades (Greek: Περουλάδες) is a village in the north-western part of the island of Corfu, Greece. Its population stood at 725 in 2011 and its economy is based mainly on tourism and secondarily on olive tree cultivation. The village has a number of narrow coves, including Canal D' Amour, Apotripiti and Logas (Sunset Beach). It administratively belongs to the Esperies municipal unit.

References

Populated places in Corfu (regional unit)